Lao Gan Ma (also called Laoganma) or Old Godmother is a brand of chili sauces made in China. The product is sold in China and over 30 other countries. Lao Gan Ma is credited with popularizing Chinese chili oil and chili crisp condiments in the western world, and have inspired many Chinese-American chili-based condiments and sauces.

History
Tao Huabi is said to have invented the sauce in 1984 and in 1989, she set up a noodle restaurant in Guiyang, Guizhou; when she noticed the popularity of her hot sauces, she converted the restaurant into a specialty shop to sell her sauces, particularly chili oil sauce. In 1994, she borrowed two houses of the CPC Yunguan Village Committee in the Nanming District and employed 40 people to work in her new sauce factory.

Difficulties with counterfeiters 
Despite the brand's success upon launch, it struggled with counterfeits with similar packaging in China. They proliferated due the Chinese government turning down Lao Gan Ma's application to trademark the product. After the trademark request was denied, over counterfeit Lao Gan Ma came to prominence. Tao countered these competitors by utilizing a branch of third-party private enterprises to target them. In 2001, the high court Beijing ruled that other similar products could not use the "Lao Gan Ma" name nor imitate its packaging; Tao received 400,000 RMB in compensation. The trademark application was later approved in 2003 after a lengthy lawsuit against a counterfeiter based in Hunan.

Tao Huabi is the owner of the company, and her son Li Guishan became the first president of the company. Women of China magazine reported in January 2011 that the company's assets were 1.3 billion RMB ($190 million USD) and that the company had 2,000 employees at that time. The sauce is produced commercially by Laoganma Special Flavour Foodstuffs Company, which was established in 1997. By 2022, the condiment became more common in locations outside of China.

Recipe dispute 
After 2016, Lao Gan Ma's sales in China declined for two years in a row. According to reports, Lao Gan Ma's annual income reached 4.549 billion RMB in 2016, 4.447 billion RMB in 2017, and 4.389 billion RMB in 2018. It was speculated that this was due to a change in the recipe in 2011,  where after the company was taken over by Tao's son, the pepper variety was changed from Guizhou Chili to Henan Chili.

The Chili of Guizhou are large in size, full in body, and contain more water, making it more suitable for making hot sauce, lending the sauce an aroma other than the spicy flavor. According to some, Lao Gan Ma lost its unique flavor after this change. In 2019, Tao Huabi became the manager of the company again, and Lao Gan Ma switched back to Guizhou chili.

Product 

A variety of flavors are produced such as Spicy Chili Crisp, Chili Oil with Black Bean, Fried Chili in Oil, Hot Chile Sauce, and Spicy Bean Paste, among others. The Lao Gan Ma products are based on traditional chili sauces found in Guizhou cuisine.

Factories
The town of Changmingzhen, Guiding County, Qiannan Buyei and Miao Autonomous Prefecture, has a Lao Gan Ma factory that opened during the COVID-19 pandemic in China.

See also 

 List of Chinese sauces
 List of condiments
 List of hot sauces

References

External links
  

Brand name condiments
Chili sauce and paste
Chinese brands
Chinese condiments
Chinese sauces
Condiment companies of China